A cloud forest, also called a water forest,  primas forest, or tropical montane cloud forest (TMCF), is a generally tropical or subtropical, evergreen, montane, moist forest characterized by a persistent, frequent or seasonal low-level cloud cover, usually at the canopy level, formally described in the International Cloud Atlas (2017) as silvagenitus. Cloud forests often exhibit an abundance of mosses covering the ground and vegetation, in which case they are also referred to as mossy forests. Mossy forests usually develop on the saddles of mountains, where moisture introduced by settling clouds is more effectively retained.

Cloud forests are among the most biodiversity rich ecosystems in the world with a large number of species directly or indirectly depending on them.

Other moss forests include black spruce/feathermoss climax forest, with a moderately dense canopy and a forest floor of feathermosses including Hylocomium splendens, Pleurozium schreberi and Ptilium crista-castrensis. These weft-form mosses grow in boreal moss forests.

Climate 

The presence of cloud forests is dependent on local climate (which is affected by the distance to the sea), the exposition and the latitude (from 23°N to 25°S), and the elevation (which varies from 500 m to 4000 m above sea level). Typically, there is a relatively small band of elevation in which the atmospheric environment is suitable for cloud forest development. This is characterized by persistent fog at the vegetation level, resulting in the reduction of direct sunlight and thus of evapotranspiration. Within cloud forests, much of the moisture available to plants arrives in the form of fog drip, where fog condenses on tree leaves and then drips onto the ground below.

Annual rainfall can range from 500 to 10,000 mm/year and mean temperature between 8 and 20 °C (46.4 and 68 °F).

While cloud forest today is the most widely used term, in some regions, these ecosystems or special types of cloud forests are called mossy forest, elfin forest, montane thicket, and dwarf cloud forest.

The definition of cloud forest can be ambiguous, with many countries not using the term (preferring such terms as Afromontane forest and upper montane rain forest, montane laurel forest, or more localised terms such as the Bolivian yungas, and the laurisilva of the Atlantic Islands), and occasionally subtropical and even temperate forests in which similar meteorological conditions occur are considered to be cloud forests.

Characteristics 

In comparison with lower-altitude tropical moist forests, cloud forests show a reduced tree stature combined with increased stem density and generally, a lower diversity of woody plants. Trees in these regions are generally shorter and more heavily stemmed than in lower-altitude forests in the same regions, often with gnarled trunks and branches, forming dense, compact crowns. Their leaves become smaller, thicker and harder with increasing altitude. The high moisture promotes the development of a high biomass and biodiversity of epiphyte, particularly bryophytes, lichens, ferns (including filmy ferns), bromeliads and orchids. The number of endemic plants can be very high.

An important feature of cloud forests is the tree crowns that intercept the wind-driven cloud moisture, part of which drips to the ground. This fog drip occurs when water droplets from the fog adhere to the needles or leaves of trees or other objects, coalesce into larger drops and then drop to the ground. It can be an important contribution to the hydrologic cycle.

Cloud forests are often peatlands, showcasing many classic peatland attributes. Due to the high water content of the soil, the reduced solar radiation and the low rates of decomposition and mineralization, the soil acidity is very high, with more humus and peat often forming the upper soil layer.

Stadtmüller (1987) distinguishes two general types of tropical montane cloud forests:
 Areas with a high annual precipitation due to a frequent cloud cover in combination with heavy and sometimes persistent orographic rainfall; such forests have a perceptible canopy strata, a high number of epiphytes, and a thick peat layer which has a high storage capacity for water and controls the runoff;
 In drier areas with mainly seasonal rainfall, cloud stripping can amount to a large proportion of the moisture available to plants.

Distribution of tropical montane cloud forests

Only 1% of the global woodland consists of cloud forests. They previously comprised an estimated 11% of all tropical forests in the 1970s. A total of around 736 cloud forest sites have been identified in 59 countries by the World Conservation Monitoring Centre, with 327 of them legally protected areas as of 2002. Important areas of cloud forest are in Central and South America (mainly Costa Rica, Venezuela, Honduras, Mexico, Ecuador, and Colombia), East and Central Africa, India, Sri Lanka, Thailand, Indonesia, Malaysia, the Philippines, Hawaii, Papua New Guinea, and in the Caribbean.

The 1997 version of the World Conservation Monitoring Centre's database of cloud forests found a total of 605 tropical montane cloud forest sites in 41 countries. 280 sites, or 46% of the total, were located in Latin America, known in biogeography as the Neotropical realm. Twelve countries had tropical montane cloud forest sites, with the majority in Venezuela (64 sites), Mexico (64), Ecuador (35) and Colombia (28). Southeast Asia and Australasia had 228 sites in 14 countries – 66 in Indonesia, 54 in Malaysia, 33 in Sri Lanka, 32 in the Philippines, and 28 in Papua New Guinea. 97 sites were recorded in 21 African countries, mostly scattered on isolated mountains. Of the 605 sites, 264 were in protected areas.

Conservation status 
Cloud forests occupied 0.4% of the global land surface in 2001 and harboured ~3,700 species of birds, mammal, amphibians and tree ferns (~15% of the global diversity of those groups), with half of those species entirely restricted to cloud forests. Worldwide, ~2.4% of cloud forests (in some regions, more than 8%) were lost between 2001 and 2018, especially in readily accessible places. While protected areas have slowed this decline, a large proportion of loss in TCF cover is still occurring despite formal protection.

Temperate cloud forests 
Although far from being universally accepted as true cloud forests, several forests in temperate regions have strong similarities with tropical cloud forests. The term is further confused by occasional reference to cloud forests in tropical countries as "temperate" due to the cooler climate associated with these misty forests.

Distribution of temperate cloud forests 

Argentina – Salta, Jujuy, Catamarca and Tucumán (Southern Andean Yungas)
Australia – Lamington National Park, Springbrook National Park, Mount Bartle Frere and Mount Bellenden Ker (Queensland) and Mount Gower (Lord Howe Island)
Brazil – Serra do Mar coastal forests
Canada – Coastal British Columbia
Chile – Bosque de Fray Jorge National Park
People's Republic of China – Yunnan Plateau, mountains of southern and eastern China
Costa Rica – Monteverde Cloud Forest Reserve. 10,500 Hectares of Cloud Forest. There are 2500 plant species (most species of orchids in a single place on earth), 100 species of mammals, 400 species of birds, 120 species of reptiles, and thousands of insects.  
Ethiopia – Harenna Forest, Bale Mountains National Park and Kafa Biosphere Reserve in South West Ethiopia Peoples' Region
Fiji Islands- Tropical Montane cloud forests of Taveuni [Ash, J., 1987. Stunted cloud-forest in Taveuni, Fiji.], Gau Island  [Keppel, G. and Thomas, N.T., 2009. Composition and structure of the cloud forest on Mt Delaco, Gau, Fiji. The South Pacific Journal of Natural and Applied Sciences, 27(1), pp.28-34.]
Republic of China (Taiwan) – Yuanyang Lake Nature Reserve, Chatianshan Nature Reserve, and Fuxing District in Taoyuan
Iran – Eastern part of Alborz mountains, north of Iran, Golestan Province
Japan – parts of Yakushima Island
New Zealand – parts of Fiordland, Mount Taranaki, and Mount Cargill
Pakistan – Shoghran Forest in the Kaghan Valley, and regions of Upper Swat in the northwest of Pakistan
Peru – Peruvian Cloud Forest
Portugal – Azores and Madeira (often refers to the wetter, higher altitude expanse of laurisilva)
Spain – Canary Islands (laurisilva) and very locally in Los Llanos del Juncal (Alcornocales Natural Park) in the Province of Cádiz.
United States – Pacific Northwest and in the Southern Appalachians.

Importance 

 Watershed function: Because of the cloud-stripping strategy, the effective rainfall can be doubled in dry seasons and increase the wet season rainfall by about 10%. Experiments of Costin and Wimbush (1961) showed that the tree canopies of non-cloud forests intercept and evaporate 20 percent more of the precipitation than cloud forests, which means a loss to the land component of the hydrological cycle.
 Vegetation: Tropical montane cloud forests are not as species-rich as tropical lowland forests, but they provide the habitats for many species found nowhere else. For example, the Cerro de la Neblina, a cloud-covered mountain in the south of Venezuela, accommodates many shrubs, orchids, and insectivorous plants which are restricted to this mountain only.
 Fauna: The endemism in animals is also very high. In Peru, more than one-third of the 270 endemic birds, mammals, and frogs are found in cloud forests. One of the best-known cloud forest mammals is the Spectacled Bear (Tremarctos ornatus). Many of those endemic animals have important functions, such as seed dispersal and forest dynamics in these ecosystems.

Current situation 

In 1970, the original extent of cloud forests on the Earth was around 50 million hectares. Population growth, poverty and uncontrolled land use have contributed to the loss of cloud forests. The 1990 Global Forest Survey found that 1.1% of tropical mountain and highland forests were lost each year, which was higher than in any other tropical forests. In Colombia, one of the countries with the largest area of cloud forests, only 10–20% of the initial cloud forest cover remains. Significant areas have been converted to plantations, or for use in agriculture and pasture. Significant crops in montane forest zones include tea and coffee, and the logging of unique species causes changes to the forest structure.

In 2004, an estimated one-third of all cloud forests on the planet were protected at that time.

Impact of climate change 
Because of their delicate dependency on local climates, cloud forests will be strongly affected by global climate change. Results show that the extent of environmentally suitable areas for cloud forest in Mexico will sharply decline in the next 70 years. A number of climate models suggest low-altitude cloudiness will be reduced, which means the optimum climate for many cloud forest habitats will increase in altitude. Linked to the reduction of cloud moisture immersion and increasing temperature, the hydrological cycle will change, so the system will dry out. This would lead to the wilting and the death of epiphytes, which rely on high humidity. Frogs and lizards are expected to suffer from increased drought. Calculations suggest the loss of cloud forest in Mexico would lead to extinction of up to 37 vertebrates specific to that region. In addition, climate changes can result in a higher number of hurricanes, which may increase damage to tropical montane cloud forests. All in all, the results of climate change will be a loss in biodiversity, altitude shifts in species ranges and community reshuffling, and, in some areas, complete loss of cloud forests.

In botanical gardens 
Cloud-forest conditions are hard and expensive to replicate in a glasshouse because it is necessary to maintain very high humidity. Day temperatures have to be between 70-75F while night temperatures have to be maintained between 55-60F. In most cases, sophisticated refrigeration equipment has to be used to provide night temperatures below 60F. Such displays are usually quite small, but there are some notable exceptions. In the United States, The Atlanta Botanical Garden has a large tropical cloud forest greenhouse with a large collection of cloud forest epiphytes from around the world. It implements a refrigeration system to decrease the temperature at night. For many years, the Singapore Botanic Gardens had a so-called coolhouse. The Gardens by the Bay features a  coolhouse that is simply named "Cloud Forest". The latter features a -high artificial mountain clad in epiphytes such as orchids, ferns, clubmosses, bromeliads and others. Due to a relatively mild climate and summer fog, the San Francisco Botanical Garden has three outdoor cloud forest collections, including a 2-acre Mesoamerican Cloud Forest established in 1985. The Buffalo and Erie County Botanical Gardens contains a "Panama Cloud Forest" garden in House 11.

Footnotes

References

External links 

 Tropical Montane Cloud Forest Initiative
 Monteverde Cloud Forest Ecology
 Roach, John (August 13, 2001). "Cloud Forests Fading in the Mist, Their Treasures Little Known". National Geographic News
 Cloud Forests United
 Tropical hydrology and cloud forests project
 Hydrology of tropical cloud forests project
 Cloud Forest Video – Rara Avis CR
 Tropical Montane Cloud Forests – Science for Conservation and Management (L.A. Bruijnzeel, F.N. Scatena and L.S. Hamilton, 2011)
 Andes Biodiversity and Ecosystem Research Group

Habitats
Montane forests
Temperate rainforests
Tropical and subtropical moist broadleaf forests
Tropical and subtropical coniferous forests
Temperate broadleaf and mixed forests